Supreme Court Library Building, now known as Greenbrier County Library and Museum, is a historic library building located at Lewisburg, Greenbrier County, West Virginia. It was built in 1834, and is a two-story building built of locally fired brick. It was constructed to serve as a law library and study for the Virginia Supreme Court of Appeals. This was leased to the State of Virginia until the court sessions ended in 1864.  During the American Civil War, it served as a military hospital. Inside the building, there is graffiti left by recovering soldiers. It was then occupied as a Masonic lodge until acquired by the Greenbrier College.  In 1935, the college deeded it to the town for use by the Greenbrier County Library and Museum. Currently, the building is used as a library by the New River Community and Technical College.

It was listed on the National Register of Historic Places in 1972.

References

1834 establishments in Virginia
American Civil War hospitals
American Civil War sites in West Virginia
Infrastructure completed in 1834
Buildings and structures in Greenbrier County, West Virginia
Greenbrier County, West Virginia in the American Civil War
Individually listed contributing properties to historic districts on the National Register in West Virginia
Libraries on the National Register of Historic Places in West Virginia
Masonic buildings in West Virginia
National Register of Historic Places in Greenbrier County, West Virginia